"Back in the High Life Again" is a song with music by English artist Steve Winwood and lyrics by American songwriter Will Jennings. It was performed by Winwood, and included backing vocals by James Taylor and a prominent mandolin played by Winwood. The song was released in January 1987 as the fifth single from his fourth studio album Back in the High Life. The song was Winwood's second number-one single on the US Adult Contemporary chart, where it stayed for three weeks. It also reached number 13 on the US Billboard Hot 100. It was nominated for the Grammy Award for Record of the Year in 1988.

Track listing 

7": Island / IS 303 United Kingdom
 "Back in the High Life Again" - 4:20
 "Help Me Angel" - 5:06

7": Island / 7-28472 United States
 "Back in the High Life Again" - 4:09
 "Night Train" (Instrumental) - 4:10

12": Island / 12 IS 303 United Kingdom
 "Back in the High Life Again" - 4:20
 "Night Train" (Instrumental) - 4:08
 "Help Me Angel" - 5:06

12": Island / PRO-A-2620 United States
 "Back in the High Life Again" - 4:20
 "Back in the High Life Again" - 5:33

 Promo

Personnel 
 Steve Winwood – lead vocals, synth piano, synthesizer, drum machine programming, mandolin, Moog bass
 Jimmy Bralower – additional drum machine programming
 Rob Mounsey – additional synthesizer
 John Robinson – drums
 James Taylor – harmony vocals

Chart history

Weekly charts

Year-end charts

References

External links
 

Steve Winwood songs
1986 songs
1987 singles
Songs written by Steve Winwood
Songs with lyrics by Will Jennings
Song recordings produced by Russ Titelman
Island Records singles